James P. Vreeland (February 4, 1910 – July 2, 2001) was an American Republican Party politician who served four terms in the New Jersey Senate after a term in the New Jersey General Assembly. He served in the Senate from 1974 to 1984, representing the 24th Legislative District until 1982, and then served one term representing the 26th Legislative District. Vreeland also served a term on the Morris County, New Jersey Board of Chosen Freeholders from 1970 until his resignation in 1972.

Biography
He was born on February 4, 1910, in the Towaco section of Montville, New Jersey, and graduated from Boonton High School in 1927. He attended both Rutgers University and Lehigh University.

Vreeland's first political position was when he was elected to the Montville Township Committee in 1956. He served as Mayor of Montville in the early 1960s, during a period when the area was facing extensive population growth and land speculation with the forthcoming development of Interstate 80 and Interstate 287 that would bring more development to the area. Though Vreeland stated that he had no plans to sell his  vegetable farm, he was a moderate on the issue of imposing zoning changes desired by many residents to require new homes to be built on properties of at least , in place of the half-acre zoning then currently in place.

Vreeland won in his first bid for the New Jersey Senate, defeating Democrat John C. Keefe by a margin of 52.6% to 47.4%. Vreeland expanded his mandate in the 1977 general election, defeating Democratic nominee Norma K. Herzfeld by 66.8%-33.2%.

In redistricting following the 1980 United States census, Vreeland was relocated to the 26th Legislative District and in the 1981 election defeated Democrat Benjamin Steltzer by his widest margin, taking 70.1% of the vote to 29.9% for the challenger.

As part of an effort to cut the $2.76 billion budget (equivalent to $ billion in ) proposed by Brendan Byrne, the Governor of New Jersey in 1976, Vreeland was one of seven members of the Joint Appropriations Committee who proposed a $2,500 reduction in the governor's salary. Vreeland argued that the cut "wouldn't hurt [the Governor] too much", though the effort was defeated.

In 1977 rankings published by the Americans for Democratic Action, Vreeland and fellow Republican Frank Davenport received the lowest rankings in the state, receiving a rating of 8% based on a series of 20 votes considered by the legislature; Teaneck Democrat Matthew Feldman was the only legislator to receive a 100% rating.

In what the Philadelphia Daily News described as a "stunning upset", Assemblymember Leanna Brown defeated Vreeland in the June 1983 Republican primary. Brown went on to win the November general election, becoming the first woman from the Republican Party to serve in the upper house of the State Legislature.

Together with their son, James P. Vreeland III, the Vreelands operated a farm in Towaco, New Jersey, near U.S. Route 202, where visitors could pick their own strawberries, tomatoes, beans, cucumbers, peppers and eggplants depending on the season.

He died at the age of 91 on July 2, 2001, at the Lincoln Park Subacute and Rehabilitation Center in Lincoln Park, New Jersey.

References

1910 births
2001 deaths
Boonton High School alumni
Mayors of places in New Jersey
County commissioners in New Jersey
Politicians from Morris County, New Jersey
Republican Party members of the New Jersey General Assembly
Republican Party New Jersey state senators
People from Montville, New Jersey
20th-century American politicians
Lehigh University alumni
Rutgers University alumni